Kearney or Kearneys is an Irish surname.

 Aaron Kearney (born 1971), Australian broadcaster, journalist and sports commentator. 
 Aidan Kearney (hurler)
 Aidan Kearney (rugby union)
 Andrew Thomas Kearney (1892–1962), founder of management consulting firm A. T. Kearney
 Anne Kearney, American chef and restaurateur
 Bernard W. Kearney  (1889–1976), Republican member of the United States House of Representatives from New York
 Bob Kearney (born 1956), former American professional baseball player
 Brett Kearney (born 1983), Australian professional rugby league footballer
 Bryan Kearney, Irish DJ/producer
 Charles E. Kearney (1820–1898), American railroad businessman
 Clayton Kearney (born 1964), former Australian sprinter and professional fitness coach
 Colm Kearney (?–2018), Irish economist
 Conor Kearney, Irish footballer and hurler
 David Kearney (disambiguation), multiple people
 Denis Kearney (1847–1907), California anti-Chinese labor leader, 1870s
 Dennis J. Kearney (born 1949), American attorney and politician in  Massachusetts
 Douglas Kearney, American poet
 Dyre Kearney (died 1791), American lawyer and delegate for Delaware to the Continental Congress
 Elfric Wells Chalmers Kearney (1881–1966), Australian inventor, engineer and author
 Emma Kearney (actress) (born 1981), Irish television and theatre actress
 Emma Kearney (sportswoman) (born 1989), Australian cricket and football player
 Eric Kearney (born 1963), American politician in the state of Ohio
 Fred Kearney (1897–1998), Canadian ice hockey player
 Garnet Kearney (1884–1971), Canadian doctor
 Gillian Kearney (born 1972), British actress
 Gus Kearney (1870–1907), Australian rules footballer
 Hagen Kearney (born 1991), American snowboarder
 Hannah Kearney (born 1986), American mogul skier
 Hugh Kearney (1924–2017), British-born historian
 James Kearney (disambiguation), multiple people
 Janis F. Kearney, American author, lecturer, and publisher
 Jim Kearney (rugby union) (1920–1998), New Zealand international rugby player
 Jim Kearney (American football) (born 1943), American football player
 Jim Kearney (Australian footballer) (1894–1944), player for Geelong and Richmond between 1915 and 1921
 John Kearney (disambiguation), multiple people
 Jonathan Kearney (born 1971), English artist
 Joseph Kearney (1927–2010), American university athletics administrator
 Liam Kearney (born 1983), Irish professional footballer
 Mark Kearney (footballer) (born 1962), English footballer
 Mark A. Kearney (born 1962), American federal judge
 Martha Kearney (born 1957), Irish-born British broadcaster and journalist
 Mat Kearney (born 1978), American singer-songwriter
 Michael Kearney (disambiguation), multiple people
 Miriam Kearney (born 1959), former Irish politician
 Molly Kearney, American actor and comedian
 Patrick Kearney (disambiguation), multiple people
 Paul Kearney (born 1967), Northern Irish fantasy author
 Peadar Kearney (1883–1942), author of the Irish national anthem
 Raymond Augustine Kearney (1902–1956), American prelate of the Roman Catholic Church
 Richard Kearney (born 1954), Irish philosopher
 Rob Kearney (born 1986), Irish rugby union footballer
 Stephen Kearney (born 1972), New Zealand rugby league footballer and coach
 Stephen W. Kearney (1794–1848), U.S. military officer
 Teresa Kearney (1875-1957), Irish religious
 Thomas Henry Kearney (1874–1956), American botanist
 Tim Kearney (American football), American football player
 Tim Kearney (politician), American politician from Pennsylvania
 Tom Kearney (disambiguation), multiple people
 Tony Kearney, Scottish actor and TV presenter
 Tully Kearney (born 1997), English swimmer
 Victor Kearney (1903–1982), Australian politician

Surnames of Irish origin
Anglicised Irish-language surnames